Hyphomicrobium coagulans is a Gram-negative, non-spore-forming, methylotrophic bacteria from the genus of Hyphomicrobium.

References

 

Hyphomicrobiales
Bacteria described in 1989